Hygroamblystegium is a genus of mosses belonging to the family Amblystegiaceae.

The genus was first described by Loeske.

The genus has cosmopolitan distribution.

Species:
 Hygroamblystegium humile
 Hygroamblystegium tenax
 Hygroamblystegium varium

References

Amblystegiaceae
Moss genera